Elsiena Janneke Meijer (born 25 January 1970) is a retired rower from the Netherlands.

Meijer was born in 1970 in Den Helder, Netherlands. At the 1994 World Rowing Championships in Indianapolis, United States, she won a gold medal with the women's coxless four and came fourth with the women's eight. At the 1996 Summer Olympics in Atlanta, United States, Meijer and Anneke Venema finished eighth in the women's coxless pair competition. She won a silver medal in the women's eight in the 2000 Summer Olympics in Sydney, Australia.

References

1970 births
Living people
Dutch female rowers
Rowers at the 1996 Summer Olympics
Rowers at the 2000 Summer Olympics
Olympic rowers of the Netherlands
Olympic silver medalists for the Netherlands
People from Den Helder
Olympic medalists in rowing
Medalists at the 2000 Summer Olympics
World Rowing Championships medalists for the Netherlands
Sportspeople from North Holland
20th-century Dutch women
21st-century Dutch women